Cezar Drăgăniță (born 13 February 1954) is a retired Romanian handball player. He won the world title in 1974 and two Olympic medals in 1976 and 1980. At the club level he spent most of his career with Steaua Bucharest, winning with them 15 national titles; he also participated in seven tournaments of the EHF Champions League, winning one in 1977. Near the end of his career he played and coached in Belgium and Portugal.

References

External links 
 
 
 

1954 births
Living people
Romanian male handball players
CSA Steaua București (handball) players
Handball players at the 1976 Summer Olympics
Handball players at the 1980 Summer Olympics
Olympic handball players of Romania
Olympic silver medalists for Romania
Olympic bronze medalists for Romania
Olympic medalists in handball
Sportspeople from Arad, Romania
S.L. Benfica handball players
Medalists at the 1980 Summer Olympics
Medalists at the 1976 Summer Olympics
20th-century Romanian people